Cabrousse Arrondissement  is an arrondissement of the Oussouye Department in the Ziguinchor Region of Senegal.

Subdivisions
The arrondissement is divided administratively into 2 rural communities and in turn into villages.

Communautés rurales :

Arrondissements of Senegal
Ziguinchor Region
Oussouye Department